Eddie Thompson (May 21, 1917 –- April 22, 1943) was a halfback in the Ontario Rugby Football Union. He served in World War II and lost his life during it.

Biography
Thompson played for his hometown Toronto Balmy Beach Beachers from 1937 to 1939, and was a two time all-star and winner of the Imperial Oil Trophy in 1939 as the ORFU Most Valuable Player. He enlisted in the Canadian Forces in 1940 and played football with Camp Borden in 1940.

In 1942 he was co-captain of the famed Toronto RCAF Hurricanes team. He scored 51 points in 1942 and was a key player on the Grey Cup champions.

Flight Lieutenant Edward Blake Thompson was reported "missing in action at sea" on April 22, 1943, and was later presumed dead.

See also
 List of people who disappeared mysteriously at sea

References

1917 births
1940s missing person cases
1943 deaths
Canadian military personnel killed in World War II
Missing in action of World War II
Ontario Rugby Football Union players
People lost at sea
Military personnel from Toronto
Players of Canadian football from Ontario
Royal Canadian Air Force officers
Royal Canadian Air Force personnel of World War II
Canadian football people from Toronto
Toronto Balmy Beach Beachers players